Angeli is a village in Lapland. The Inari River flows by the village, which is located close to the Norwegian border. Most of the people speak Northern Sámi as their native language.

The village is connected by all-weather gravel roads north to Karigasniemi and east to the village of Inari.

History 
The name of Angeli is derived from the surname Angeli, originating from the village of Peltovuoma (Bealdovuopmi) in Enontekiö. The surname is derived from the name of the lake Angelijärvi, itself derived from a Kemi Sámi word referring to the long-tailed duck (compare Inari Sámi áŋálâh). In the middle of the 19th century, two young men from the Angeli family moved from Peltovuoma to Inari, with the village eventually growing around their settlement.

People
Ulla Pirttijärvi

See also 
Angelit
Lappmarken
Lääni
Sami people
Sápmi (area)

References

External links
 Angeli on Google Maps

Villages in Inari, Finland